Gorgopis furcata is a moth of the family Hepialidae. It is found in South Africa.

References

Moths described in 1942
Hepialidae